Portola Hills is a district in the city of Lake Forest, California in Orange County, United States. It was formerly an unincorporated community and census-designated place before it was annexed into Lake Forest in 2000. The population was 6,391 at the 2000 census. Portola Hills lies near Whiting Ranch Wilderness Park and Cleveland National Forest. Foothill Ranch is to the west, Rancho Santa Margarita in the southeast, Mission Viejo in the south, and the unincorporated regions of Silverado and Santiago Canyon to the north and northeast.

History

The tracts were developed in the late 1980s through the early 1990s.  The development was named after Gaspar de Portolá, California's first terrestrial Spanish explorer, who passed through the vicinity in 1769.  (Nearby Trabuco Canyon is named for a blunderbuss which was lost by expedition members.)

Geography

Portola Hills is located at  (33.683672, -117.632872).

Demographics
As of the census of 2000, there were 6,391 people, 2,164 households, and 1,729 families residing in the CDP. The racial makeup of the CDP was 84.60% White, 1.63% African American, 0.30% Native American, 6.76% Asian, 0.13% Pacific Islander, 2.64% from other races, and 3.94% from two or more races. Hispanic or Latino of any race were 10.03% of the population.

There were 2,164 households, out of which 52.4% had children under the age of 18 living with them, 69.4% were married couples living together, 8.1% had a female householder with no husband present, and 20.1% were non-families. 14.0% of all households were made up of individuals, and 1.4% had someone living alone who was 65 years of age or older.  The average household size was 2.95 and the average family size was 3.30.

In the CDP, the age distribution of the population shows 32.9% under the age of 18, 4.9% from 18 to 24, 41.4% from 25 to 44, 18.0% from 45 to 64, and 2.9% who were 65 years of age or older.  The median age was 33 years. For every 100 females, there were 97.4 males.  For every 100 females age 18 and over, there were 92.2 males.

Estimated median household income in 2016: $126,434 (it was $90,874 in 2000) Estimated per capita income in 2016: $50,437 (it was $34,057 in 2000)

Politics
In the state legislature Portola Hills is located in the 37th Senate District, represented by Republican John Moorlach, and in the 68th Assembly District, represented by Republican Steven Choi. Federally, Portola Hills is located in California's 45th congressional district, which is represented by Democrat Katie Porter.

Housing

There are 14 tracts of housing built in single and multi-family configurations that can be classified as Condominium, Townhouse, Semi-Detached and Detached:
 Condominium – 2 tracts (Canyon View and Canyon View West) with a total of 225 units (18.5 units/acre) featuring 1 and 2 bedroom floorplans (644 to 1038 sqft);
 Townhouse – 3 tracts (Bella Palermo, Canyon Rim, and Montecido) with a total of 657 units (9.6 to 13.3 units/acre) featuring 2 and 3 bedroom floorplans (940 to 1378 sqft);
 Semi Detached – 2 tracts (Serenado and Sycamore Ridge) with a total of 378 units (5.1 to 8.9 units/acre) featuring 2 and 3 bedroom floorplans (1139 to 1891 sqft); and
 Detached – 7 tracts (Alderwood, Antiqua, J.M. Peters Portola, Crestmont, Crown Pointe, Live Oak Estates, Portola Hills Estates, and The Oaks) with a total of 921 units (3.1 to 7.4 units/acre) featuring 3 to 6 bedroom floorplans (1273 to 3584 sqft).

Schools
Children living in the area attend Portola Hills Elementary.

Built in the mid-1990s, Portola Hills Elementary was subject to litigation between the SVUSD school district and the developer concerning land movement at the school site. The litigation was dismissed due to procedural issues regarding the statute of limitations. In 2004, three buildings were vacated for safety reasons due to damage potentially caused by the land movement and the students relocated in portable/temporary classrooms until a permanent solution could be made. As of mid-2008, the developer (USA Portola Center, LLC) entered into a School Facilities Funding and Mitigation Agreement with the school district for development originally known as "Portola Hills South" and now known as "Portola Center." That agreement requires the developer to pay the district $2,900,000 (in addition to any other new development mitigation fees), solely for use in the repair of the school. As of June 2008, the district is moving forward with plans to repair two buildings and potentially demolish/rebuild the third provided approval is obtained from the Department of State Architecture.

See also
 Cleveland National Forest

References

Former census-designated places in California
Neighborhoods in Lake Forest, California